Fair Bluff is a town in Columbus County, North Carolina, United States that was devastated by coastal flooding from Hurricane Matthew in 2016 and inundated again by high water by Hurricane Florence in 2018.

Before the two events, the population was 951 at the 2010 census but is believed to be lower following the two disasters, some estimates going as low as 450 people. The shrinking of town's size, and damage from the storms has led to a rapid decline in tax base.

History
Fair Bluff was the name originally given to a bluff overlooking the Lumber River. In 1807 plans were made to build a town upon the lands of John Wooton at the bluff to be known as Wootonton. The town was established but the name was never changed. The community was reincorporated in 1873.

The Powell House was listed on the National Register of Historic Places in 1978.

Agriculture has always been a mainstay of the economy in the town. Tobacco was a major commodity grown in the area. By the eighties, tobacco growing subsided. This caused a shift for the town and its citizens. The downtown continued to thrive until the late 1980s when a car dealership moved from the business district to another location.  Haphazard town planning saw a mixture of residential, business, and industry all over town.  Tens of millions in US government grants poured into the city beginning in the mid-1980s until present day.  But the town continued to decline and people left for better opportunities elsewhere. The decline in Fair Bluff was similar to neighboring towns of Tabor City, Broadman, Brunswick, Cerro Gordo, and Chadbourn. A town manager was hired to handle administrative duties of the town,

In 1999, Fair Bluff experienced a devastating flood event.

In 2012, the Police Chief of Fair Bluff Marty Lewis was arrested, tried and convicted for selling and delivering oxycodone and possession with the intent to sell and conspiracy to traffic while acting as police chief. He was sentenced to a minimum of seven years in prison and fined $100,000. On April 9, 2015, Marty Lewis filled an appeal of his case. On November 3, 2015, the verdict was unanimously affirmed by the North Carolina Court of Appeals, leaving in place the 90 to 117-month prison sentence originally imposed. Lewis will not be eligible for parole before November 2022.

In 2016, the town was devastated by flooding on the Lumber River caused by Hurricane Matthew, prompting the evacuation of hundreds of residents. Floodwaters reached the town hall, police department, fire department, a grocery store, and a school. As of June 2018, the rebuilding effort was still underway but several hundred residents who had fled rising floodwaters never returned and a number of businesses remained shuttered.

In September 2018 Fair Bluff was flooded again by the impact of Hurricane Florence, again forcing evacuations and leaving the downtown area under water again, and destroying 72 homes. After Florence, many buildings in the downtown area of the town lay abandoned, with no plans to reoccupy or fix them. The town's only factory closed several months later, and hundreds of residents moved away. The federal government bought out some residents' properties, straining the municipal government's tax base. The town government drew up plans to level the historic business district and turn it into a park, and build a new business district further away from the river.

Government

Fair Bluff has a part-time town manager, assisted by the elected town mayor and town council. The town manager also works for five other deteriorating towns in Columbus County.

Fair Bluff is in the 13th District for the North Carolina Senate, represented by Michael Walters as of September 2014, and in the 46th district for the North Carolina House of Representatives, where, as of September 2021, they are represented  by Tabor City native and used car dealer Brenden Jones.

Geography
Fair Bluff is located at  (34.311212, -79.032387), The town lies within the Carolina Border Belt, a regional network of tobacco markets and warehouses along both sides of the North Carolina-South Carolina border.

Demographics

As of the census of 2000, there were 1,181 people, 505 households, and 308 families residing in the town. The population density was 547.4 people per square mile (211.1/km2). There were 588 housing units at an average density of 272.6 per square mile (105.1/km2). The racial makeup of the town was 59.27% African American, 37.93% White, 0.68% Native American, 1.19% from other races, and 0.93% from two or more races. Hispanic or Latino of any race were 1.44% of the population.

There were 505 households, out of which 26.7% had children under the age of 18 living with them, 37.2% were married couples living together, 20.8% had a female householder with no husband present, and 39.0% were non-families. 36.0% of all households were made up of individuals, and 19.8% had someone living alone who was 65 years of age or older. The average household size was 2.32 and the average family size was 2.98.

In the town, the population was spread out, with 25.2% under the age of 18, 7.6% from 18 to 24, 24.1% from 25 to 44, 23.6% from 45 to 64, and 19.4% who were 65 years of age or older. The median age was 39 years. For every 100 females, there were 77.3 males. For every 100 females age 18 and over, there were 72.5 males.

The median income for a household in the town was $17,008, and the median income for a family was $22,969. Males had a median income of $20,764 versus $16,731 for females. The per capita income for the town was $9,829. About 31.8% of families and 37.1% of the population were below the poverty line, including 50.9% of those under age 18 and 24.3% of those age 65 or over.

References

Works cited 
 

Towns in Columbus County, North Carolina
Towns in North Carolina